Gerald Perzy (born 14 August 1967) is an Austrian football manager and former player. He has stepped in as interim coach at FC Blau-Weiß Linz on 6 separate occasions.

External links
 

1967 births
Living people
Austrian footballers
Austrian football managers
Association football midfielders
FC Blau-Weiß Linz players
LASK players